William Fytche (–1728) was an English politician, Member of Parliament for  in Essex.

Life
He was the son of Sir Barrow Fytche of Woodham Walter, Essex and his wife Elizabeth, daughter of Sir Mundeford Bramston. After his father died, in 1673, he was brought up by his uncle George Bramston, an academic and judge, and a Tory. He appointed William Bramston, brother of George and defender of Anglican orthodoxy, Rector of Woodham Walter in 1686.

Fytche stood for parliament at Maldon in 1698, when he lost to Irby Montagu, brother of Charles Montagu; he was then twice successful in 1701. He dropped out of what was by then a safe seat, intending to pursue a position as an official, with the assistance of Henry St John; but he stood again in 1711, becoming a lottery comptroller, and so resigning his seat. He died on 12 September 1728, at age 57.

Family

Fytche married Mary, daughter of Robert Corey of Danbury: they had five sons and eight daughters. Their youngest son was William Fytche, briefly Governor of Bengal. His wife is elsewhere known as Elizabeth.

Notes

1670s births
Year of birth uncertain
1728 deaths
People from Maldon, Essex
English MPs 1701
English MPs 1701–1702
English MPs 1702–1705
English MPs 1705–1707
Members of the Parliament of Great Britain for English constituencies
British MPs 1707–1708
British MPs 1710–1713
Members of Parliament for Maldon
Alumni of Queens' College, Cambridge